Sharyn Storm Keating (née Uechtritz; born 27 October 1981) is an Australian fashion designer, brand ambassador, television director and producer, now based in London. She has worked on a number of Australian and British television programmes such as The Apprentice Australia, Masterchef Australia, The X Factor, The Voice Australia, and The Voice UK. She is the wife of singer Ronan Keating.

Early life and education 
Sharyn Storm Uechtritz was born in Childers, Queensland, Australia, the daughter of Gordon Charles Uechtritz, a cattleman, and Debra Lynn (née Hastings), also known as Sharni Ra'harni, a business consultant, healer and Reiki practitioner. Keating's birth name was Sharyn Storm Uechtritz. Her parents loved the name "Storm" used in one of Wilbur Smith's novels, and decided to give her the name; concerned that, because of her name, she might be made fun of later on in her life, they added the name Sharyn.

Keating grew up in a small village in Papua New Guinea, before her family relocated to a cattle property in Australia in 1988. Keating has three older brothers.

After school, she attended the University of Queensland (Australia) for three years; she subsequently received an international exchange scholarship to study at University of California, Los Angeles in 2003, for the final year of her degree education.

Career 

During her time at the University of California Los Angeles, Keating completed an internship at HBO in the Original Programming Department under Chris Albrecht. It was upon her return to Australia that Keating began her career in television production at Channel Nine in Sydney.

In 2009, she worked on the production of the Australian version of NBC's The Apprentice. From 2010–2012, Keating went on to work with popular formats including The X Factor, Masterchef and The Voice. In 2012, she relocated to London where she became the producer-director of The Voice UK.

Keating collaborated on a range of boots with legendary Italian bootmaker, Stivaleria Cavallin. Called the 'Storm Boots', these were launched in February 2015 at the Burberry show during London Fashion Week. In October 2015, Keating was announced as Ambassador for Positive Luxury, a London-based company which globally awards luxury brands with an interactive Trust Mark for meeting sustainability and ethical business criteria.

Keating had a fashion and lifestyle blog for a while in 2016/2017.

Personal life 
Keating (then known by her maiden name, Uechtritz) married Tim Ivers in August 2009. They had first met while she was studying at the University of Queensland. Their marriage ended in April 2012. She started dating Ronan Keating in August 2011 after she met him on the Australian The X-Factor show. She subsequently married him on 17 August 2015. Storm took Keating's name after marriage. They have two children together, a son Cooper Archer Keating, born on 26 April 2017 and a girl, Coco Knox Keating, who was born 27 March 2020. She is of German, Danish, Samoan and English descent.

Filmography

References

External links
 

1981 births
Living people
Australian people of Samoan descent
Australian people of Danish descent
Australian people of English descent
Australian people of German descent
Australian television producers
Australian women television producers
University of Queensland alumni
University of California alumni
Australian bloggers
Australian women bloggers
Australian fashion designers
Australian women fashion designers
Australian women company founders
Australian company founders